Raymond Taylor Kenyon (October 21, 1878 – November 30, 1929) was an American dentist and politician from New York.

Life 
Kenyon was born on October 21, 1878 in Leonardsville, New York, the son of James B. Kenyon, pastor of the local Methodist Episcopal Church, and Margaret. His sister was actress Doris Kenyon.

Kenyon moved to Syracuse with his family when he was young. He graduated from Syracuse High School in 1896. He then attended Syracuse University, the Philadelphia Anatomical School, and the Philadelphia Dental College and Garretson Hospital of Oral Surgery, graduating from the latter in 1900. He was a member of Xi Psi Phi. After practicing as a dentist for a short while in Philadelphia, he moved his practice to Syracuse. A back injury led him to move to the Adriondack area, settling in Au Sable Forks. In 1909, he was elected town supervisor of Jay, serving in that office until 1913. He was postmaster of Au Sable Forks for a short time.

In 1913, Kenyon was elected to the New York State Assembly as a Republican, representing Essex County. He served in the Assembly in 1914, 1915, 1916, 1917, 1918, 1919, and 1920. He was an alternate delegate to the 1924 Republican National Convention.

Kenyon had a daughter, Mrs. Floyd Fitzsimmons. He was a Freemason.

Kenyon died at home of acute  angina pectoris on November 30, 1929. He was buried in Fairview Cemetery.

References

External links 

 The Political Graveyard

1878 births
1929 deaths
Politicians from Syracuse, New York
Syracuse University alumni
People from Jay, New York
American dentists
20th-century American politicians
Republican Party members of the New York State Assembly
Town supervisors in New York (state)
American Freemasons
Burials in New York (state)